Matt Suggs is an American indie rock musician.

Born and raised in Visalia, California, Suggs was a member of Butterglory in the 1990s before launching a solo career in 2000. He released two albums on Merge Records, which Richie Unterberger described as "reminiscent of...The Kinks' Ray Davies". Later in the 2000s he was a founding member of White Whale.

Discography
Golden Days Before They End (Merge Records, 2000)
Amigo Row (Merge, 2003)

References

American rock musicians
Living people
Year of birth missing (living people)
Merge Records artists